The Genesis Championship is a men's professional golf tournament in South Korea. The inaugural event was held at the Jack Nicklaus Golf Club Korea from 21 to 24 September 2017. Prize money was KRW1,500,000,000, the largest for any Korean Tour event. The winner received KRW300,000,000 and an automatic entry to the CJ Cup and Genesis Open on the PGA Tour. The 2018 event was held in May while in 2019 and 2020 it was held in October.

The tournament is sponsored by Genesis Motors, the luxury vehicle division of Hyundai Motor Group.

Winners

References

External links

Korean Tour events
Golf tournaments in South Korea
Recurring sporting events established in 2017
2017 establishments in South Korea